The Federal College of Education (Technical), Umunze is a Nigerian technical tertiary institution located in Umunze, Orumba South Local Government Area of Anambra State, Nigeria. It is affiliated to Nnamdi Azikiwe University for its degree programmes.

History 
Federal College of Education (Technical), Umunze was established by Decree No. 4 of 14 March 1986 and fully started operation in November 1989. The Late Igwe of Umunze, Mathias Ugochukwu and the Igwe of Azia, Prof. T. I. Eze, who is also the pioneer provost of the college, played a huge role in the establishment of the institution. At the beginning of the institution operation, it inherited buildings of All Saints Anglican Secondary School, Umunze and started with just 70 Students ( 23 males and 47 females). The school, currently awards PRE-NCE, NCE (Regular, CEP and Sandwich), Degree (Regular, CEP and Sandwich) and Post Graduate Diploma in Education certificates.

Students 
The college recently had a population of about 6,000 in NCE programme, 1,200 in Degree and 455 students in Post Graduate Diploma in Education.

Courses 
The college offers various courses through the following schools:
1. School of Business Education
2. School of Education
3. School of Agric and Home Economics Education
4. School of Industrial Technical Education
5. School of Science Education
6. School of Fine and Applied Arts Education
7. School of Languages

The institution also exposes students to the practical aspects of what they learn in the classrooms through the SIWES programme.

Affiliation 
The institution through its affiliation with Nnamdi Azikiwe University, Awka offers programmes leading to the award of Bachelors in Education (ed) in the following areas;

 Physics Education
 Computer Science Education
 Business Education
 Early Childhood Education
 Biology Education
 Chemistry Education
 Library and Information Science
 Integrated Science Education
 Educational Management and Policy
 Building and Woodwork Technology
 Electrical and Electronics Technology
 Auto Mechanical Technology
 Mathematics Education

The  college Library 
The college library is manned or headed by the college librarian. The college library also called  "Prof. Ben Nwabueze Library" , which opened its doors in May 1990, is situated at the College's main campus. With an online integrated capacity of roughly 10 million books and journals, it offers a Virtual Library part powered by e-granary.

THE OBJECTIVES OF THE LIBRARY 
The Library's main goal is to act as a hub for educational research. In more detail,

1. To offer comprehensive resources (books, visual and audio-visual materials) for study, teaching, and research for the College's students, faculty, and other accredited individuals.

2. To instill in the pupils the value of reading and other library habits through ordinary classroom education in GSE112.

3. To keep the library's resources safe for use in the future.

4. To give library patrons sufficient reading space and other library services.

The following departments make up the college library:

Administration: Charged with overseeing the day-to-day operations of the library and ensuring that its goals are met.

Acquisition: In charge of choosing, ordering, and receiving books and other chosen resources.

Cataloguing Department: Responsible for classifying and categorizing books and other relevant resources.

Serial/Documents/Archives: In charge of the distribution of the materials and the receipt, recording, display, and storage of periodicals, newspapers, and associated publications.

Public Service: Responsible for the circulation of library materials and reference work.

Reprographic and Bindery Services: The College Library now offers complete reprographic and bindery services. The modern bindery handles both library items and other permitted resources. Additionally, there is a cutting-edge photocopier that provides reprographic services for both employees and students.

Library Complex and Virtual Library: The Campus I-based Library Complex and Virtual Library are both operational. There are two sections of the Virtual Library that can be accessed online. The Granary, one of the components, has more than ten million instructional resources. Another area where the Library is anticipated to develop and display its riches is the green stone.

THE LIBRARY SERVICES

The following services are available to readers of the college library:

 Current awareness service.

 Selective dissemination of information.

 Indexing and abstracting service.

 Accession lists are published periodically.

 Reference service.

 Reading room service.

 Reserve reading service.

 Reprographic (photocopying) service.

RULES ANDREGULATIONS OF THE LIBRARY

1.Any student who wants to use the library must first complete a registration card at the lending counter and agree to abide by the library's rules. The borrower's tickets issued at registration are non-transferable, and the registration is only valid for the current academic year and must be renewed after that.

2. The average loan term for books is four weeks. If no other readers are interested in the books, a renewal for another four weeks is possible. The book must be given back following this renewal.

3. All overdue books are subject to fines of NW (ten Naira) each working day, per book.

a. At no time may a student have more than two books out on loan.

It is forbidden to write on, annotate, highlight, cut, or otherwise mutilate books.

b. At any given moment, students are only permitted to have two books out on loan.

c. Books must not be annotated, highlighted, clipped, or otherwise damaged.

d. If a student loses or seriously damages a book, they are responsible for paying the full replacement cost.

e. In order to avoid serious disciplinary action, any library books that are taken out of the library must be properly borrowed.

f. At the library's entrance, all students departing with books or papers must allow the porter to check them.

4. The Library and its surroundings must be kept in order. The reading rooms must be kept completely silent.

5. Food is not permitted in the Library.

6. Smoking is not permitted in the reading rooms.

Briefcases, umbrellas, and other luggage must be left at the Library entrance or in designated areas within the Library.

7. To avoid distracting readers, students should not wear hard shoes.

References

Education in Anambra State
1989 establishments in Nigeria
Federal colleges of education in Nigeria
Educational institutions established in 1989